St. Mary's Cathedral also called Cathedral of the Immaculate Conception is a religious building belonging to the Catholic Church and located in the Kakrail, Ramna Road, in Dhaka, Bangladesh. It was established in 1956 and his feast is celebrated on December 8.

It belongs to the Roman or Latin rite and is home to the Metropolitan Archdiocese of Dhaka (Latin: Archidioecesis Dhakensis; Bengali: ঢাকার বিশপের এলাকা).  It is one of two cathedrals located in the city, the other being dedicated to St. Thomas and belonging to the Anglican Church. Its Metropolitan Archbishop is Patrick D'Rozario. It is dedicated to the Virgin Mary in her title of the Immaculate Conception.

See also
 Roman Catholicism in Bangladesh

References

Roman Catholic cathedrals in Bangladesh
Churches in Dhaka
Roman Catholic churches completed in 1956
20th-century Roman Catholic church buildings